Élie Ossipovitch (born 10 December 1987) is a French classical guitarist, who studied in the Conservatory of Chambéry, and followed private lessons with prominent French classical guitarists. He has been performing as well as teaching across Europe and India for the last five years. His repertoire includes pieces from the sixteenth century to today.

Biography
As a teenager Ossipovitch started with heavy metal and eventually moved on to classical guitar. He took private lessons from some of the prominent classical guitarists from various parts of France. For further professional studies Elie joined the Conservatoire de Chambéry. During that period he started teaching in the Conservatoire d'Albertville, in several associated schools as well as private classes. Gradually he started performing in musical festivals, in churches and private concerts.

References

External links
Merveilleux concert à PIERRERUE

1987 births
French classical guitarists
French male guitarists
Living people
21st-century guitarists
21st-century French male musicians